Vakhtapur is a village in the Mehsana district of Gujarat, India.

History 
It was a minor 6th class princely state in the Mahi Kantha Agency during colonial rule and ruled by Koli chieftains. 

In 1901 it comprised the town and three other villages, with a combined population of 1,744, yielding 5,788 Rupees state revenue (1903-4, mostly from land), paying double tribute: 1,188 Rupees to the Gaekwar Baroda State and 486 Rupees to Idar State.

References 

Villages in Mehsana district
Princely states of Gujarat